The An-Nur Mosque is a mosque in Alor Village, Dili, East Timor.

History
The mosque was originally constructed in 1955 with the initiative from Hasan Bin Abdulah Balatif, the head of Alor Village. On 20 March 1981, the mosque underwent renovation.

Architecture
The mosque consists of two floor, in which the ground floor is the main prayer hall and the upper floor is a school.

See also
 Islam in East Timor

References

1955 establishments in Portuguese Timor
Islam in East Timor
Mosques completed in 1955
Religious buildings and structures in East Timor
Buildings and structures in Dili